Nososticta mouldsi is a species of Australian damselfly in the family Platycnemididae,
commonly known as a striped threadtail. 
It has only been found in the Northern Territory, where it inhabits rainforest streams.

Nososticta mouldsi is a small, slender damselfly; the male is black with blue markings, and the female is black with pale yellow-brown markings. As at February 2018 there were just five records of this species on the Atlas of Living Australia.

Gallery

See also
 List of Odonata species of Australia

References 

Platycnemididae
Odonata of Australia
Insects of Australia
Endemic fauna of Australia
Taxa named by Günther Theischinger
Insects described in 2000
Damselflies